The 2019 United Kingdom general election was held on 12 December 2019 to elect all 650 members of the House of Commons, including the 40 Welsh seats.

Despite the Labour party winning the most votes in Wales, the Conservatives won across the UK.

Compared to the 2017 general election, the Labour Party lost six seats, each of which was won by the Conservative Party. This reflected a decrease in vote share of 8% from the Labour Party, matched by increases in vote share for the Brexit Party and Conservative Party of 5.4% and 2.5%, respectively. However, the Labour Party remained the party receiving the most votes, with a 40.9% vote share. Having gained Brecon and Radnorshire in the 2019 Brecon and Radnorshire by-election earlier in the year, the Welsh Liberal Democrats lost to the Conservatives. Plaid Cymru retained its four seats.  The party did not make any gains, and its total vote share was down 0.5%.

Overall, 1,544,357 votes were cast in Wales, reflecting a turnout of 66.6% of the electorate.

Electoral system
MPs are elected in 40 Single Member constituencies by the first-past-the-post system.

History and background
The election was called on 29 October 2019, when its date was fixed as 12 December.

In the European Elections in Wales of June 2019, the Brexit Party, newly formed, had taken 32.5% of the votes and won two seats, Plaid Cymru had come second with 20% and one MEP, Jill Evans, and Labour had finished third, with 15.3% and also one MEP, Jackie Jones.

In the run-up to the general election, the Conservative party suspended the whip of one of its MPs, Guto Bebb of Aberconwy, who then sat as an independent until the end of the parliament and did not seek re-election. Additionally, the Conservative party lost a by-election in Brecon and Radnorshire to the Liberal Democrats. Before the election, the numbers were 28 Labour MPs, six Conservative, four Plaid, one Liberal Democrat, and one Independent (Bebb).

Plaid Cymru had gained one seat in the previous election. The party was for stopping Brexit and holding a second referendum on the Brexit withdrawal agreement, which was at odds with how Wales had voted in the 2016 referendum. The party did not make any gains, and its total vote share was down 0.5%.

Target seats

Labour 
 Arfon, Plaid Cymru (Plaid hold)
 Preseli Pembrokeshire, Conservative (Conservative hold)

Plaid Cymru 

 Ynys Môn, Labour (Conservative gain)
 Llanelli, Labour (Labour hold)

Results

Results by constituency

Opinion polling 

(Includes polls in which polling concluded on or before: 31 May 2019)

See also 
 2019 United Kingdom general election in England
 2019 United Kingdom general election in Northern Ireland
 2019 United Kingdom general election in Scotland

Notes

References

2019 in Wales
2010s elections in Wales
Wales
2019